RSS enclosures are a way of attaching multimedia content to RSS feeds by providing the URL of a file associated with an entry, such as an MP3 file to a music recommendation or a photo to a diary entry. Unlike e-mail attachments, enclosures are merely hyperlinks to files.  The actual file data is not embedded into the feed (unless a data URL is used). Support and implementation among aggregators varies: if the software understands the specified file format, it may automatically download and display the content, otherwise provide a link to it or silently ignore it.

The addition of enclosures to RSS, as first implemented by Dave Winer in late 2000 , was an important prerequisite for the emergence of podcasting, perhaps the most common use of the feature . In podcasts and related technologies enclosures are not merely attachments to entries, but provide the main content of a feed.

Syntax 
In RSS 2.0, the syntax for the <enclosure> tag, an optional child of the <item> element, is as follows:
 <enclosure url="http://example.com/file.mp3" length="123456789" type="audio/mpeg" />
where the value of the url attribute is a URL of a file, length is its size in bytes, and type its mime type.

It is recommended that only one <enclosure> element is included per <item>.

Prefetching 

The RSS <enclosure> has similarities to:
 the SMIL <prefetch> element,
 the HTML <link> element with rel="prefetch".
 the HTTP Link header with rel="prefetch".  (See  section 19.6.2.4.)
 the Atom <link> element with rel="enclosure"

See also 
 Broadcatching
 Internet television
 Podcast
 Photofeed
 Vlog

References

External links 
 The <enclosure> tag in the RSS 2.0 specification
 mod_enclosure - Enclosures in RSS 1.x

RSS
Web syndication formats
XML-based standards